Pachydactylus maraisi is a species of lizard in the family Gekkonidae. The species is endemic to Namibia.

Etymology
The specific name, maraisi is in honor of African herpetologist Johan Marais.

Geographic range
P. maraisi is found in coastal central Namibia.

Description
Dorsally, P. maraisi is dark brown, with white flecks.

Behavior
P. maraisi is rupicolous (rock-dwelling).

Reproduction
The mode of reproduction of P. maraisi is unknown.

References

Further reading
Heinicke MP, Adderly LM, Bauer AM, Jackman TR (2011). "A long-known new species of gecko allied to Pachydactylus bicolor (Squamata: Gekkonidae) from the central Namibian coast". African Journal of Herpetology 60 (2): 113–129. (Pachydactylus maraisi, new species).
Herrmann H-W, Branch WR (2013). "Fifty years of herpetological research in the Namib Desert and Namibia with an updated and annotated species checklist". Journal of Arid Environments 93: 94–115.
Schleicher, Alfred (2020). Reptiles of Namibia. Windhoek, Namibia: Kuiseb Publishers. 271 pp. .

Endemic fauna of Namibia
Pachydactylus
Reptiles of Namibia
Reptiles described in 2011